Frédéric Courtois (1860–1928) was a French missionary and naturalist.

Frédéric Courtois was a  missionary in China from 1901 until his death. He directed Musée Heude in Xujiahui. Courtois was primarily interested in ornithology and botany. From 1906 to 1928, he organized expeditions in the provinces of Kiangsu and the mountains of Anhwei and the Huangshan range. On these expeditions, he brought back some 40,000 specimens.  His Anhwei plant collection was published in 1933 by his successor, Dr. Henry Belval.

In 1923 Auguste Ménégaux gave the scientific name Garrulax courtoisi to the blue-crowned laughingthrush in his honor.

Works
1912. Catalogue des oiseaux du Musée de Zi-Kia-Wei (Xujiahui) Mém. Hist. Nat. Emp. Chinois, 5 (3) : 1-98.
1927. Les oiseaux du musée de Zi-Kia-Wei  Mém . Hist. Nat. Chine, 5 (3), 5e fasc.:123-159.

References
Bo Beolens et Michael Watkins (2003).Whose Bird ? Common Bird Names and the People They Commemorate. Yale University Press (New Haven et Londres) : 400 p. 
Borrell, Octavius William, 1991 A short history of the Heude Museum "Musee Heude: its botanist and plant collectors Journal of the Royal Asiatic Society Hong Kong Branch'' Vol. 31 (1991 )ISSN 1991-7295 

French naturalists
French ornithologists
19th-century French botanists
1928 deaths
1860 births
Missionary botanists
20th-century French botanists